Saint-Alexandre may refer to:

Saint-Alexandre, Gard
Saint-Alexandre, Quebec